The Pubenza Festivities are a festival in Popayán, Colombia, known for its competition of Chirimías which were folkloric musical groups. See Festivals in Colombia for more Colombian festivals.

See also

List of music festivals in Colombia 
List of folk festivals

References

 
Music festivals in Colombia
Folk festivals in Colombia